Polemonium eximium, the skypilot or showy sky pilot, is a perennial plant in the phlox family (Polemoniaceae) that grows at high altitudes (mostly above ). It is endemic to the Sierra Nevada in California where it grows in the talus of the high mountain slopes.

Wildflower enthusiasts consider it to be among the best of the Sierra wildflowers, and highly rewarding to find.

Habitat and range
It mostly occurs in colonies in stark surroundings, above , in rocky areas that appear mostly devoid of soil, and rarely in association with other plants.

Most notably, it can be found at the upper reaches of Mt. Whitney, both via the main trail and mountaineer's route, as well as the southern flanks of Mt Langley in the Inyo National Forest. Additionally, it resides near the summit of Mount Dana in Yosemite National Park.

Description

Growth pattern

Leaves and stems

Inflorescence and fruit
The showy inflorescence is a crowded head of many flowers. The bright deep blue to whitish-blue to pink-lavender flowers are fragrant. Each flower has a tubular calyx of hairy sepals and a funnel-shaped corolla spreading to lobes. The flowers are at full bloom for approximately one day apiece in the very short period of appropriate flowering conditions. The plant has a strong scent reminiscent of urine which attracts pollinators to its short-lived flowers. It blooms from June to August.

References

External links
 Photo gallery at CalPhotos

eximium
Endemic flora of California
Flora of the Sierra Nevada (United States)
Flora without expected TNC conservation status